Early parliamentary elections were held in Egypt on 29 November 1990, with a second round for 261 seats on 6 December. They followed a referendum in October on the early dissolution of Parliament due to issues surrounding the legality of the 1987 elections. However, the elections were boycotted by the Socialist Labour Party (SLP), the Liberal Socialists Party (LSP) and the New Wafd Party, which claimed that the reformed Electoral Law would fail to ensure free elections.

The result was a victory for the ruling National Democratic Party (NDP), which won 348 of the 444 elected seats. However, a further 56 of the 83 independent candidates were affiliated with the NDP, whilst 14 were affiliated with the New Wafd Party, 8 with the SLP and one with the LSP. Voter turnout was reported to be 44.2%, but was estimated to be only 20-30%.

Results

References

Egypt
1990 in Egypt
Election and referendum articles with incomplete results
Elections in Egypt
November 1990 events in Africa
December 1990 events in Africa